Little Men, or Life at Plumfield with Jo's Boys, is a children's novel by American author Louisa May Alcott (1832–1888), which was first published in 1871 by Roberts Brothers. The book reprises characters from her 1868–69 two-volume novel Little Women, and acts as a sequel, or as the second book in an unofficial Little Women trilogy. The trilogy ends with Alcott's 1886 novel Jo's Boys, and How They Turned Out: A Sequel to Little Men. Alcott's story recounts the life of Jo Bhaer, her husband, and the various children at Plumfield Estate School. Alcott's classic novel has been adapted to a 1934 film, a 1940 film, a 1998 film, a television series, and a Japanese animated television series.

Background
Alcott's novel narrates six months in the life of the students at Plumfield, a school run by German Professor Friedrich and his wife, Mrs. Josephine Bhaer (née March).  The idea of the school is first suggested at the very end of Little Women, Part Two, when Jo inherits Plumfield Estate from her late Aunt March.

Alcott’s first inspiration for bringing educational ideals into the home and the development of a home-like model into the classroom, stems from her father, Amos Bronson Alcott, “an educational reformer and prominent Transcendentalist.”   As a “Transcendentalist visionary,” her father was considered unconventional even among his reform contemporaries. Educational theorists such as Johann Heinrich Pestalozzi, also provided the inspiration for Alcott’s educational methodologies and “stressed the need for the school to be as homelike as possible."

As an educational reformer, Alcott's father believed education, “should simply turn the child’s mind inward to recognize that divinity.” Alcott's father also “believed that the theatrical performance of moral allegories by children would train them in the self-restraint that was the basis of domestic harmony and happiness."

Bronson Alcott’s appeal to children’s imagination “was part of an effort to harness the child’s imaginative powers to the pursuit of the passionless life.” Alcott incorporates family dramatizations for the children of Plumfield to teach children "how to control every aspect of their self-expression.”

One of the main models for Friedrich was Henry David Thoreau (in fact he appears in multiple disguises in all of LMA´s novels). Louisa attended Concord Academy where Henry and his brother John were teachers. Some of the elements in Friedrich´s character that come from Henry in Little Men, include Friedrich using phrases such as "gods garden". Friedrich has given all children their own little garden spots, which is something that Henry did as well. In the same way as Jo and Friedrich, Henry and Louisa often went to long walks together. Henry was a naturalist and his interest in the natural world can be seen in Little Men in Dan Kean´s character.

Summary

The story begins with the arrival of Nat Blake, a shy young orphan who is gifted at playing the violin and telling fibs. Nat narrates the story and introduces each character which features several cameo appearances from characters from the original Little Women novel.  There are ten boys attending the school already.  Then, Nat comes to Plumfield, followed by his friend Dan.  After that, Nan arrives and becomes a companion for Daisy, the only girl. Jo's sons, Rob and Teddy, are younger than the others. Rob, Teddy, Daisy and Nan are not counted among the pupils.

Plumfield is not run by conventional means. All the children have their own gardens and their own pets and are encouraged to experiment with running businesses. Pillow fights are permitted on Saturdays, subject to a time limit. Children are treated as individuals, with a strong emphasis on gently molding their characters.

Daisy Brooke, Meg's daughter, attends Plumfield with her twin brother Demi, but she is somewhat isolated with no other girls her age, until Nan's arrival. Nan is even more of a willful tomboy than Jo was as a teenager, while Daisy is mainly interested in dolls and her own mini kitchen.   Daisy’s mini kitchen includes a cast iron child-sized oven which was purchased by Jo's brother-in-law, Uncle Teddy, husband of her youngest sister Amy March. Near the end of the novel, Daisy's father, John, dies quietly one night.

The other newcomer to Plumfield, Dan, is introduced by Nat. Dan originally decides the other boys are "molly-coddles" and leads them in experiments with boxing, fighting, drinking, smoking, profanity, and card games, which results in him being temporarily removed from the school. Dan eventually returns to Plumfield with an injured foot and redeems himself by standing up for Nat when Nat is falsely accused of theft by the other boys. He later becomes a curator of the school's natural history museum.

Personal relationships are central to the school, and diversity is celebrated. Daisy is deeply attached to her twin brother, to shy Nat, and to tomboy Nan. Nan and Tommy are also close and intend to marry when they grow up. Dan, already friends with Nat, is unexpectedly drawn to the pious Demi and the toddler Teddy. While Franz, Emil, Daisy and John are all related to the Bhaers, they are not treated with favouritism and are encouraged to overcome their faults just the same as the other pupils.

Style
In the Introduction of Louisa May Alcott: A Biography, author Madeleine B. Stern states that “Louisa May Alcott was throughout her life a professional author skilled in creation and the re-creation implicit in revision.” Alcott's works borrowed “as source material episodes from her life, her observations, her travels, her experiences, [and] her reading.” Alcott’s legacy remains in her depiction of life and her devotion to family. Her overall work is considered, “neither of Hell nor of Heaven, but of a multitude of stories in a variety of literary genres, ranging from fairy tales to realistic war sketches, from sensation thrillers to domestic sagas.”

Analysis
Commentaries suggest that “even Little Women and its successors, Little Men and Jo’s Boys, were not immune from critics in hot pursuit of gender relations, power struggles, and sexual politics.” According to Stern’s biography, “in the case of Louisa May Alcott, such interpretations are very tempting, since she herself provided such an intriguing arsenal of ammunition.”

As an educational reformist, Alcott "proves to be attuned to what eventually, in the twentieth century, became a solution to this obstacle: differentiation, or the idea that all children need not learn the same things." As an example, Alcott’s use of performance and acting in the home creates a “fictional adaptation of her father’s allegorical nursery theater, [where] domestic drama is made an inextricable part of the moral struggles of everyday life.” The Alcott family theatrics “proved a means of establishing peace between them, as Louisa learned to use family theater to curb her frantic demands for personal freedom and bring herself into conformity with her father’s domestic ideal.” Through adaptations of family theater, the characters in Little Men “learn to view themselves as little garden plots growing large crops of patience, perseverance, and good temper.”

Publication
In 1865, Alcott was first encouraged to write a book for girls, including memories of her childhood, and while she was employed as an editor at Merry Museum, a Boston children’s magazine, she began writing the Little Women trilogy which includes Little Women, Little Men, or Life at Plumfield with Jo's Boys and How They Turned Out: A Sequel to Little Men.   Little Men was originally published by Roberts Brothers in 1871, and the first edition included 376 pages and since its original publication, Alcott's work has been published in many formats, languages, and adapted for younger readers.

Reception
The novel centers around "a diverse and challenging set of students—orphaned boys, the next generation of Marches, physically and mentally challenged children, a motherless girl, children of the merchant class—Alcott comments on the possibilities and limitations of science education for the masses."

In the novel, Alcott “is able to devote her attention to the benefits and risks of science education on an individual basis rather than imagining students in the abstract.” Little Men discusses the gray area in-between where a teacher can “cover the whole ground of human culture—physical, intellectual, moral, spiritual, and practical.”

Soon after the publication of Little Men, educational advocates and reformers alike “embraced these theories too, arguing their applicability to all children but particularly of the poor, who, it was believed, most needed the moral education a homelike school could offer." Little Men addresses two ideals of learning which had previously been separated, home and school. 

Plumfield becomes an ideal model of a combined home and school, where Alcott's characters grow into adulthood, and their learning "outcomes are inflected not only by class and gender but also, most important, by the students' preexisting values and moral leanings."

Adaptations

Film
Little Men was first adapted into film in 1934 starring Erin O'Brien-Moore and Ralph Morgan. Another film followed in 1940 with Kay Francis. In 1998, a Canadian feature starring Mariel Hemingway and Chris Sarandon was released.

Television
In 1993, an animated television series based on this novel ran in Japan, Little Women II: Jo's Boys, which has been dubbed into several different languages, though not English. A Canadian television series, Little Men, aired in 1998 to 1999 for two seasons. The plot is somewhat altered and acts more as a continuation of the novel.

See also

Little Women II: Jo's Boys

External links
 
 Little Men: Life at Plumfield With Jo's Boys Chicago, New York: M. A. Donohue & Co., c1871 at A Celebration of Women Writers

Notes

References
Alcott, Louisa May (1868). Little Women (1953 ed.). Melbourne; London; Baltimore: Penguin Books. .
Alcott, Louisa May (1871). Little Men. Boston: Roberts Brothers. .
Cheever, Susan (2011). Louisa May Alcott: A Personal Biography. Simon and Schuster. .
Matteson, John (2007). ). Eden's Outcasts: The Story of Louisa May Alcott and Her Father. New York: W. W. Norton & Company. .
Halttunen, Karen. ""The Domestic Drama of Louisa May Alcott"". Gale. Feminist Studies. Retrieved 22 February 2020.
Speicher, Allison. "A Space for Science: Science Education and the Domestic in Louisa May Alcott's Little Men". Galileo. Journal of Literature and the History of Ideas. Retrieved 7 February 2020.
Stern, Madeleine B. (1999). Louisa May Alcott: A Biography. Boston;Hanover;London: Northeastern University Press;University Press of New England. Retrieved 22 February 2020.

 
1871 American novels
Novels by Louisa May Alcott
Novels set in schools
Sequel novels
Novels republished in the Library of America
American novels adapted into films
American novels adapted into television shows
Works based on Little Women